Rebecca Strong  (23 August 1843 – 24 April 1944) was an English nurse who pioneered preliminary training for nurses.

Early years and education 
Rebecca Strong (née Thorogood) was born in London on the 23 August 1843. Married young and widowed by the age of twenty, Strong decided to go into a career in nursing and was accepted as one of the first probationers at the Nightingale Training School at St Thomas's Hospital, London in 1867. Strong continued her training at Winchester Hospital before moving to the British Army Hospital at Netley as part of a team of nurses selected to reorganise nursing at the hospital.

Career 
Strong was appointed matron of Dundee Royal Infirmary in 1874. She took up the post of matron, installed at the behest of Florence Nightingale at Glasgow Royal Infirmary in 1879. Apart from a period between 1885-1891 when she ran her own nursing home she remained at Glasgow until she retired in 1907.

In 1895 at Glasgow Royal Infirmary she started its first training school for nurses, based on Nightingale's model, and her methods were later widely adopted by the profession.

In 1929 when she was in her mid-80s she addressed the International Council of Nurses in Montreal in Canada.

In the 1939 New Year Honours she was appointed an Officer of the Order of the British Empire (OBE).

On her 100th birthday in 1943, the King and Queen sent her a telegram that congratulated her on her distinguished services to the nursing profession. Queen Mary sent her a letter and signed portrait of herself. She was also presented with a number of illuminated address including ones from the Nightingale Fellowship, Glasgow Royal Infirmary and the Scottish Nurses Club.

Strong died aged 100 on 26 April 1944 at Vicars Cross in Cheshire where she had lived since 1941.

References

1843 births
1944 deaths
Nurses from London
Officers of the Order of the British Empire
English centenarians
Women centenarians